Mike Mohring (born 22 December 1971) is a German politician of the Christian Democratic Union (CDU).

Early life and education 
Mohring grew up in the GDR. On a scholarship of the Hanns Seidel Foundation, he studied law at the University of Jena, without completing the degree. He later completed a double degree program in international business and tax law at the Frankfurt School of Finance & Management and the MCI Management Center Innsbruck from 2007 until 2009.

Political career

Career in state politics
Mohring started his political career during the fall of the Berlin Wall by joining the New Forum. In 1993 he became a member of the CDU.

Mohring was first elected to the Landtag in the 1999 state elections. In parliament, he served on the Committee on Internal Affairs (1999-2004) and on the Budget Committee (1999-2009). From 2008, he chaired the CDU parliamentary group.

In 2014, Mohring became leader of his party in Thuringia. He was reelected in 2016. In this capacity, he led the party's campaign for the 2019 state elections.

Role in national politics
On the national level, Mohring served as a CDU delegate to the Federal Convention for the purpose of electing the President of Germany in 2009, 2010 and 2012. 

In the negotiations to form a fourth coalition government under Chancellor Angela Merkel following the 2017 federal elections, Mohring was part of the working group on economic affairs, led by Thomas Strobl, Alexander Dobrindt and Brigitte Zypries. In 2019, he was appointed by the leaders of CDU and CSU, Annegret Kramp-Karrenbauer and Markus Söder, to the parties’ ad-hoc steering group on climate policy.

In September 2020, Mohring announced that he would run for a parliamentary seat in the 2021 national elections.

Other activities 
 Mitteldeutscher Rundfunk (MDR), Member of the Broadcasting Council 
 HSV Apolda, Member

Political positions 
In October 2015, amid the European migrant crisis, Mohring visited a refugee camp in Lebanon to learn more about the plight of Syrians fleeing the violence in the ongoing Syrian civil war that erupted in 2011; he subsequently demanded more German support for Syria's neighbors.

Ahead of the Christian Democrats’ leadership election in 2018, Mohring publicly opposed Friedrich Merz's candidacy to succeed Angela Merkel as the party’s chair. For the 2021 national elections, he later endorsed Armin Laschet as the Christian Democrats' joint candidate to succeed Merkel as chancellor.

References

Christian Democratic Union of Germany politicians
Members of the Landtag of Thuringia
1971 births
Living people
20th-century German politicians
21st-century German politicians
People from Apolda